Major Simon Affleck (ca. 1660 – 1725) was a Swedish tax official, of Scottish descent, who worked in then Swedish-ruled Finland. He had been appointed by the King of Sweden to collect taxes in the Pielisjärvi region, and also paid the rent of his mansion in Pielisjärvi to the King.

His probable grandfather Hillebrand or Gilbert Affleck was born in Scotland and was a burgess in Turku and inspector of gunpowder factories.

Affleck is said to have been a ruthless collector of taxes with little pity towards the poor Finnish peasants. This, and the large and ferocious dog he kept as a pet, earned him the nickname Simo Hurtta (hurtta is Finnish for hound).

Affleck died in 1725 after the Greater Wrath. He is said to have shot himself in the head in his mansion to deny the Finnish peasants raiding his mansion the satisfaction of killing him.

References

 Onni Palaste: The Simo Hurtta trilogy:
 Simo Hurtta, 1978
 Simo Hurtta ja Anna, 1982
 Simo Hurtta ja Isoviha, 1983

External links
 Book about the Affleck family in Finland, by Maija Salo

1660s births
1725 deaths
Finnish people of Scottish descent
Swedish people of Scottish descent
Swedish civil servants
Tax collectors
Suicides by firearm in Finland